Netherlands is scheduled to compete at the 2017 World Aquatics Championships in Budapest, Hungary from 14 July to 30 July.

Medalists

Diving

Netherlands has entered 4 divers (one male and three female).

Men

Women

Mixed

Open water swimming

The Netherlands has entered three open water swimmers

Swimming

Dutch swimmers have achieved qualifying standards in the following events (up to a maximum of 2 swimmers in each event at the A-standard entry time, and 1 at the B-standard):

Men

* Kamminga tied for sixteenth place, but lost in a three-way swim-off to Slovenia's Peter John Stevens and did not advance.

Women

** Van der Meer tied for sixteenth place, but lost in a swim-off race to Israel's Andrea Murez and did not advance.

Mixed

Synchronized swimming

Netherlands' synchronized swimming team consisted of 2 athletes (2 female).

Women

Water polo

The Netherlands qualified a women's team.

Women's tournament

Team roster

Laura Aarts
Yasemin Smit (C)
Dagmar Genee
Sabrina van der Sloot
Amarens Genee
Nomi Stomphorst
Marloes Nijhuis
Vivian Sevenich
Maud Megens
Ilse Koolhaas
Lieke Klaassen
Kitty Joustra
Deddy Willemsz

Group play

Playoffs

9th–12th place semifinals

Ninth place game

References

Nations at the 2017 World Aquatics Championships
Netherlands at the World Aquatics Championships
2017 in Dutch sport